The Alma Doepel is a three-masted topsail schooner and is one of the oldest such ships surviving.

Early history
Alma Doepel was built in 1903 in Bellingen, NSW, by Frederick Doepel and named after his youngest daughter Alma. Until 1915 she operated between Sydney and the northern rivers district of New South Wales. In late 1915 she was sold to Tasmanian owners and commenced operation in Tasmania, mainly carrying timber and goods between Hobart and Melbourne. She was fitted with an auxiliary engine in 1916, and again in 1936. In a 1937 refit her rig was simplified from having square topsails on the foremast to having a fore-and-after rig. In 1943 she was requisitioned by the army, refitted and renamed AK82, and used as an army supply vessel running from Townsville and Darwin to Papua New Guinea. After the war she was reverted to merchant vessel configuration, resuming operation in Tasmania in 1946. From 1961 to 1975 she was stripped of her rigging and used to carry limestone, before being sold, for the scrap value of her engines, to the Melbourne company Sail & Adventure in 1976.

This ship was also used in the opening credits of Quigley Down Under in 1990.

Restoration
In July 1976 ownership was transferred to Sail and Adventure Ltd., a non-profit organisation formed to restore and use the ship as a sail training vessel. From 1976 to 1987, Alma Doepel was comprehensively restored. Stage one of the restoration had been completed by mid-1978. In mid-1978 the Port of Melbourne Authority provided berthing and storage facilities at North Wharf. By December 1979 a new deck had been fitted and lower masts had been stepped and rigged. During 1980 a new keel and rudder were fitted at a slipway constructed at Hastings. Sails were fitted in 1983. Limited sailing occurred by January 1984. She led the Parade of Sail in Sydney Harbour in January 1988. From July 1988 she was used as a sail training ship, based in Melbourne, until 1999 when the need for work on the hull and lack of funds put a stop to this activity. In April 2001, Alma Doepel was taken to Port Macquarie where she was berthed at Lady Nelson Wharf and open to the public as a static exhibit. In January 2009 the Alma Doepel returned to Melbourne.

From 2013, she is berthed at No 2 Victoria Dock (Melbourne), mounted on a submergible barge, undergoing an extensive refit to return her to survey so she can recommence sail training. 
On October 16, 2021 she was lifted off the barge and back into the water by the AAL Shanghai and is ready for re-rigging and her internal fit-out.

See also
 List of schooners

Notes

References

External links

  Alma Doepel website
 Alma Doepel Chronicles: Photos and details of the restoration of the Melbourne tall ship the Alma Doepel
 Alma Doepel virtual tour

Schooners of Australia
Ships built in New South Wales
Tall ships of Australia
Sail training ships
Three-masted ships
1903 ships
Merchant ships of Australia
Ships of Australia